Sinali Latu (born in Tonga in 1965) is a retired Tongan-Japanese rugby union player. He played in Japan for Sanyo and also played for the Japan national rugby union team. Now he coaches the Daito Bunka University rugby team. He is the founder of the non-profit organisation Japan-Tonga Friendship Association. He was nicknamed "Bill" (ビル) during his playing career in Japan.

Viliami Sinali Latu played for Tonga's national side while attending Tonga College at the age of 19. He moved to study and play in Japan with a Tonga College school mate, Uatesoni Namoa.

Family
Latu's younger brother, Tevita Latu, played sevens for Tonga while studying in Tonga College in 2000 before moving to New Zealand. The youngest of the Latu brothers, Kilifi, has captained the Tongan sevens team and played rugby in New Zealand, together with his older brothers Penieli and Langakali, and in the United States. Penieli played for Tonga in the 1995 World Cup. The Latu brothers all studied at Tonga College. They all played for South Canterbury's Celtic Rugby Club.

References

External links

1965 births
Living people
Tongan rugby union players
Tongan rugby union coaches
Japanese rugby union players
Japanese rugby union coaches
Tongan emigrants to Japan
Naturalized citizens of Japan
Japan international rugby union players
Tongan expatriate rugby union players
Expatriate rugby union players in Japan
Tongan expatriate sportspeople in Japan
Saitama Wild Knights players
People from Haʻapai
Japan international rugby sevens players
Tonga international rugby union players